"Better Man" is a song by the American rock band Pearl Jam. It is the eleventh track on the band's third studio album, Vitalogy (1994). The song was written by vocalist Eddie Vedder. Despite the lack of a commercial single release, "Better Man" reached the top of the Billboard Album Rock Tracks chart and spent a total of eight weeks at number one. The song was included on Pearl Jam's 2004 greatest hits album, rearviewmirror (Greatest Hits 1991–2003).

Origin and recording
The song was written by vocalist Eddie Vedder when he was in high school. He said, "I wrote 'Better Man' before I could drink—legally—on a four-track in my old apartment." In another interview, Vedder stated, "Sometimes I think of how far I've come from the teenager sitting on the bed in San Diego writing 'Better Man' and wondering if anyone would ever even hear it."

He first performed it with a San Diego, California–based group called Bad Radio, with slightly faster tempo but altogether quite similar to the Vitalogy rendition. Vedder later recorded it with Pearl Jam, although Pearl Jam was initially reluctant to record it and had initially rejected it from Vs. due to its accessibility.

Producer Brendan O'Brien said of the song: There's a great song we recorded for Vs., "Better Man," which ended up on Vitalogy. One of the first rehearsals we did they played it and I said "Man, that song's a hit." Eddie just went "uhhh". I immediately knew I'd just said the wrong thing. We cut it once for Vs., he wanted to give it away to this Greenpeace benefit record, the idea was that the band was going to play and some other singer was going to sing it. I remember saying to the engineer, Nick [DiDia], "This is one of their best songs and they're going to give it away! Can't happen!" And we went to record it and I'm not going to say we didn't try very hard, but it didn't end up sounding very good. I may have even sabotaged that version but I won't admit to that. It took us to the next record, recording it two more times, before he became comfortable with it because it was such a blatantly great pop song.

Lyrics
Al Weisel of Rolling Stone called the song a "haunting ballad about a woman trapped in a bad relationship." When "Better Man" was performed on VH1 Storytellers in 2006, Vedder introduced it as a song about "abusive relationships." Before a performance of the song at Pearl Jam's show on April 3, 1994, in Atlanta at the Fox Theatre, Vedder clearly said "it's dedicated to the bastard that married my Momma." He was referring to his stepfather, Peter Mueller, a California attorney whom Vedder had long believed to be his biological father and who divorced his mother in the early 1980s.

Reception upon release

Although never released as a single, "Better Man" nonetheless became one of Pearl Jam's most-played songs on the radio in the U.S. "Better Man" became the most successful song from Vitalogy on the American rock charts. The song reached the top of Billboard'''s Album Rock Tracks chart, number two on their Modern Rock Tracks chart, and number 13 on their Top 40 Mainstream chart in 1995. The song spent a total of eight weeks at number one on the Album Rock chart. It appeared on Billboard magazine's Hot 100 Airplay chart, reaching the top 20. In Canada, the song reached the top ten on the Canadian Singles Chart on March 6, 1995. At the 13th annual Pop Music Awards of the American Society of Composers, Authors and Publishers, "Better Man" was cited as one of the most-performed ASCAP songs of 1995. Chris True of AllMusic proclaimed it as "arguably the stand out track on 1994's Vitalogy—and equally arguably—[one of] the band's better songs in the whole of their career." He added, "Vitalogy was, admittedly, the end of Pearl Jam's reign as top rock act and it's because of songs like "Better Man" that they were able to stay there without succumbing to all the traps of stardom and shameless marketing." When "Better Man" was performed on VH1 Storytellers in 2006, Vedder introduced it as a song about "abusive relationships".

In 2021, American Songwriter and Kerrang each ranked the song number six on their lists of the greatest Pearl Jam songs.

Various performances

"Better Man" was first performed live at the band's May 13, 1993, concert in San Francisco at Slim's Café, almost six months before the album's release, and had more of an up-tempo beat attached to it. In Pearl Jam concerts, the slow opening verses and choruses of "Better Man" are frequently sung as much by the audience as by Vedder.
The song is often performed live as a medley with The English Beat's "Save It for Later".
At the last Vote for Change concert on October 13, 2004, in East Rutherford, New Jersey at Continental Airlines Arena, Vedder made a guest appearance with Bruce Springsteen and the E Street Band and sang "Better Man" upon Springsteen's request; sizeable numbers of the audience sang along with it. Pearl Jam performed the song for its appearance on VH1 Storytellers in 2006.
At Pearl Jam's August 29, 2006, concert in Arnhem, Netherlands at the Gelredome, Vedder tagged Bob Marley's "No Woman, No Cry" at the beginning of "Better Man".
The song is also a part of the so-called "Man" trio ("Better Man", "Nothingman", "Leatherman") played occasionally at concerts. There is no connection between the three songs beyond the word "man" being in each of their titles.
Certain live performances of "Better Man" can be found on albums such as: Live on Two Legs, the international versions of the "Nothing as It Seems" single, the bonus disc included in the Japanese edition of Binaural, various official bootlegs, the compilation album For the Lady, the iTunes exclusive release The Bridge School Collection, Vol. 1, the Live at the Gorge 05/06 box set, the live album Live at Lollapalooza 2007, and the Canadian iTunes edition of Backspacer.
Performances of the song are also included on the DVDs Touring Band 2000, Live at the Showbox, Live at the Garden, and Immagine in Cornice. The version of the song on The Bridge School Collection, Vol. 1'' is a subdued acoustic performance by the band and was recorded live at the Bridge School Benefit.

Charts

Weekly charts

Year-end charts

References

External links
 Lyrics at pearljam.com
 [ Review of "Better Man"] at AllMusic

1994 songs
Pearl Jam songs
Songs written by Eddie Vedder
Song recordings produced by Eddie Vedder
Song recordings produced by Stone Gossard
Song recordings produced by Jeff Ament
Song recordings produced by Mike McCready
Song recordings produced by Dave Abbruzzese
Song recordings produced by Brendan O'Brien (record producer)
Songs about domestic violence